Seyed Kamal Sajjadi is an Iranian diplomat and politician.

Sajjadi is the spokesman for the "Front of Followers of the Line of the Imam and the Leader".

He is Secretary-General of the Islamic Society of Employees, head of the Iran-Vietnam Friendship Association and an employee of the Ministry of Foreign Affairs.

He served as Iran's Ambassador to the Philippines from 1987 to 1991 and Iran's Ambassador to Vietnam from 1995 to 1999. Sajjadi has also been Iran's Accredited Ambassador to Cambodia and director of Iran's representative office in Brunei.

References

Iranian diplomats
Living people
Year of birth missing (living people)
Ambassadors of Iran to the Philippines
Ambassadors of Iran to Vietnam
Ambassadors of Iran to Cambodia
Front of Followers of the Line of the Imam and the Leader politicians
Secretaries-General of political parties in Iran